Henan Rebecca Hair Products is a Chinese manufacturer of hair products. It is the largest hair products producer in the world .

History
The company was founded in 1995. It launched an overseas presence in 1999 by opening in Nigeria. In 2003, it became the first hair products company listed on the Shanghai Stock Exchange.

Consumer markets
The company operates in China but almost all of its products are sold in export markets. Rebecca Hair operates in the US, Europe, and over 20 countries in Africa. The African market is particularly important for the company and accounts for about half of the company's overall revenue; in 2017 African revenue reached 884 million yuan (138.1 million U.S. dollars). Nigeria is the focal point of African operations but there are smaller subsidiaries in Ghana, Togo, Côte d'Ivoire, Burkina Faso, the Democratic Republic of the Congo, Tanzania, and Kenya.

Manufacturing
The company has factories in China, Nigeria and Ghana. Manufacturing of synthetic hair products requiring use of machinery with constant power supply is located in China.

References

Companies listed on the Shanghai Stock Exchange
Companies based in Henan